The Roman Catholic Diocese of Burlington covers the entire U.S. state of Vermont; there are 125 parishes divided over 10 deaneries.

Addison Deanery
Church of the Assumption of the Blessed Virgin Mary, Middlebury
Seat of the Middlebury College Newman Center
Our Lady of Good Help Parish:
St. Agnes, Leicester
Masses only held from May to October
St. Mary, Brandon
St. Ambrose, Bristol
St. Bernadette, Bridport
St. Genevieve, Shoreham
St. Peter, Vergennes

Bennington Deanery
Christ Our Savior Parish:
St. Margaret Mary, Arlington
St. Paul, Manchester Center
Our Lady of Fatima, Wilmington
Sacred Heart St. Francis de Sales, Bennington – Established in 1854 and 1880 as separate parishes, respectively; merged on July 1, 1995
St. Joachim, Readsboro
St. John the Baptist, North Bennington – Established in 1885
St. John Bosco, Stamford

Burlington Deanery (City of Burlington)
Cathedral of Saint Joseph
Christ the King-St. Anthony Parish
St. Augustine Chapel
Parish of the University of Vermont and seat of its Catholic Center
St. Mark

Capital Deanery
North American Martyrs, Marshfield
Our Lady of the Snows, Waitsfield
St. Andrew, Waterbury
St. Augustine, Montpelier
St. Cecelia St. Francis Cabrini, East Barre
St. John the Evangelist, Northfield – Established in 1870
Seat of the Norwich University Newman Center
Yoked with St. Edward of Williamstown 
St. Monica, Barre
St. Patrick, Moretown
St. Sylvester, Graniteville

Franklin Deanery (Franklin, Grand Isle and Lamoille Counties)
All Saints, Richford
Ascension, Georgia
Blessed Sacrament, Stowe
Holy Angels, St. Albans
Immaculate Conception (St. Mary's), St. Albans
The Most Holy Name of Jesus
Holy Cross, Morrisville
Seat of the Johnson State College Newman Center
St. Theresa, Hyde Park
Nativity of the Blessed Virgin Mary-Saint Louis Parish, Swanton/Highgate Center
Our Lady of Lourdes, Eden
St. Amadeus, Alburgh
St. Ann, Milton
St. Anthony, Sheldon Springs
St. Anthony – St. George, East Fairfield
St. Isidore, Montgomery Center
St. John the Baptist Parish:
St. John the Baptist, Enosburg Falls
St. Mary, Franklin
St. Joseph, Grand Isle
St. Joseph, Isle La Motte
St. Luke, Fairfax
St. Mary of the Assumption, Cambridge
St. Patrick, Fairfield
St. Rose of Lima, South Hero

Northeast Kingdom Deanery
Corpus Christi Parish:
Our Lady Queen of Peace, Danville
St. Elizabeth, Lyndonville
St. John the Evangelist, St. Johnsbury
Seat of the Lyndon State College Newman Center
Mary, Queen of All Saints:
Our Lady of Fatima, Craftsbury
St. Michael, Greensboro Bend
St. Norbert, Hardwick
Mater Dei:
St. Benedict Labre, West Charleston
St. Edward the Confessor, Derby Line
St. James the Greater, Island Pond
St. Mary Star of the Sea, Newport
Most Holy Trinity:
St. John Vianney, Irasburg
St. Paul, Barton
St. Theresa, Orleans
Sacred Heart of Jesus, Troy
St. Ignatius, Lowell

Rutland Deanery
Okemo Valley Catholic Community: 
Church of the Annunciation of the Blessed Virgin Mary, Ludlow – Established in 1876
Holy Name of Mary, Proctorsville – Established in 1869
Our Lady of the Mountains, Killington
Our Lady of the Seven Dolors, Fair Haven
Mission: St. Matthew of Avalon, West Castleton
Masses held during the Summer months only
Rutland-Wallingford Catholic Community:
Christ the King, Rutland
Immaculate Heart of Mary, Rutland
St. Patrick, Wallingford
St. Alphonsus Liguori, Pittsford
St. Anne, Middletown Springs
St. Frances Cabrini, West Pawlet
St. John the Baptist, Castleton
Seat of the Castleton University Newman Center
St. Paul, Orwell
St. Peter's Church, Rutland
St. Raphael, Poultney
West Rutland Catholic Community:
St. Bridget, West Rutland – Established in 1857
St. Dominic, Proctor
St. Stanislaus Kostka, West Rutland – Established in 1907

South Burlington Deanery (Southern Chittenden County)
Our Lady of Mount Carmel, Charlotte
St. Catherine of Siena, Shelburne
St. John Vianney, South Burlington
St. Jude, Hinesburg

Windham–Windsor Deanery
Chapel of the Snows, Stratton
Maternity of the Blessed Virgin Mary, Springfield
Our Lady of the Angels, Randolph
Our Lady of Light, South Strafford
Our Lady of Mercy, Putney
Our Lady of Perpetual Help, Bradford
Our Lady of the Snows, Woodstock
Our Lady of the Valley Parish:
Our Lady of Mercy, Townshend
St. Anthony, Bethel
St. Elizabeth, Rochester
St. Anthony, White River Junction
St. Charles, Bellows Falls
St. Edmund of Canterbury, Saxtons River
St. Eugene I, Wells River
St. Francis of Assisi, Norwich
St. Michael, Brattleboro
St. Joseph Chapel, Londonderry
St. Joseph the Worker, Chester

Winooski Deanery (Eastern Chittenden County)
Holy Cross, Colchester
Holy Family/St. Lawrence Parish, Essex Junction
Immaculate Heart of Mary, Williston
Our Lady of Grace, Colchester
Our Lady of the Holy Rosary, Richmond
St. Francis Xavier, Winooski
Saint Michael's College Chapel, Colchester
St. Pius X, Essex
St. Stephen, Winooski
St. Thomas, Underhill Center

References

External links
Parishes of the Diocese (click on "Parishes")
Official site of the Diocese

Roman Catholic Diocese of Burlington
Burlington